The men's 1 mile at the 1962 British Empire and Commonwealth Games as part of the athletics programme was held at the Perry Lakes Stadium on Thursday 29 November and Saturday 1 December 1962.

32 runners competed in three heats in the first round, with the top three runners from each heat qualifying for the final.

The event was won by the world recorder holder and winner of the 880 yards event, New Zealander Peter Snell in 4:04.6. Snell finished 0.5 seconds ahead of his fellow countryman John Davies and Terry Sullivan representing the Federation of Rhodesia and Nyasaland.

Records

Heats

Heat 1

Heat 2

Heat 3

Final

References

Men's 1 mile
1962